Marcel Hirscher (born 2 March 1989) is an Austrian former World Cup alpine ski racer. Hirscher made his World Cup debut in March 2007. He competed primarily in slalom and giant slalom, as well as combined and occasionally in super G. Winner of a record eight consecutive World Cup titles, Hirscher has also won 11 medals at the Alpine Skiing World Championships, seven of them gold, a silver medal in slalom at the 2014 Winter Olympics, and two gold medals in the combined and giant slalom at the 2018 Winter Olympics. Due to his record number of overall titles and many years of extreme dominance of both slalom and giant slalom, he is considered by many, including his former rivals Henrik Kristoffersen, Kjetil Jansrud and Alexis Pinturault, to be  the best alpine skier in history. He won a total of 67 World Cup races, ranking second on the male all-time list.

Career
At the 2010 Winter Olympics, Hirscher placed fourth in the giant slalom and fifth in the slalom at Whistler Creekside.  He placed fourth in the giant slalom at the 2009 World Championships, but broke his ankle the weekend preceding the 2011 World Championships, which ended his 2011 season.

Returning after injury, Hirscher had an outstanding season in terms of wins in 2012, with 9 victories and a total of 14 podiums, all in the two technical events (except for one third place in the season's last Super G). He won the World Cup overall and giant slalom titles, and placed third in the slalom.

In October 2012, Hirscher was awarded the Skieur d'Or Award by members of the International Association of Ski Journalists for his performances during the previous season.

Hirscher won the overall World Cup title again in 2013 with 6 victories; he also won the slalom title and was runner-up in giant slalom. Hirscher scored a total of 18 podium finishes out of 19 races in the two technical events. The only race in either slalom or giant slalom where he finished outside the top 3 was the giant slalom in Adelboden. In that particular race Hirscher was leading after the first run, built up his advantage to over a second in the second run, but nearly fell several gates before the final, thus missing the win and finished only 16th. He became the first male racer to retain the overall World Cup title since fellow Austrian Stephan Eberharter in 2002 and 2003 and the first to win it three years in a row since American Phil Mahre did so in 1981, 1982 and 1983.

In 2015, Hirscher dominated the giant slalom standings with 5 wins, including a winning margin of 3.28 seconds in Garmisch, and won the GS title for the second time.  With his slalom win in Zagreb he became the most successful Austrian male World Cup slalom skier surpassing Benjamin Raich. In the final race of the season in Meribel he overturned a 55-point deficit in the standings by winning his 16th World Cup slalom, and with it won the slalom title for the third year in a row. Hirscher became the first male alpine skier to win the overall World Cup title four times in a row.

In 2016, Hirscher became the most successful Austrian male World Cup GS skier by winning in Beaver Creek, Colorado, surpassing Benjamin Raich and Hermann Maier.  With his GS win in Alta Badia, Italy (his 3rd consecutive win at that venue), he became Austria's most successful World Cup GS skier overtaking Annemarie Moser-Pröll.  Another GS win in Kranjska Gora, Slovenia confirmed Hirscher as the GS title winner with one race to go.  To wrap up an amazing season with 8 wins and 19 podiums Hirscher also won the men's overall World Cup title, his 5th consecutive overall title, a feat never before achieved by a male skier.  His points total also enabled Austria to narrowly beat France in the men's nations cup by 201 points, the narrowest winning margin for many years.  Hirscher was the only Austrian male skier to win a race in the entire season, and scored 30.9% (1,795 out of 5,804) of the Austrian men's nations cup points.

On 13 November in Levi, Finland, Hirscher won the first slalom of the 2017 season and equalled Pirmin Zurbriggen's win total of 40, putting him equal 5th in the standings.  He also achieved his 93rd podium, surpassing Benjamin Raich's total.  On 18 December he won the fourth giant slalom of the season in Alta Badia having finished second in the three preceding giant slalom races, equalling Alberto Tomba's 4 wins at the venue, and with it became the 5th most successful male World Cup winner.  On 7 January Hirscher achieved his 100th podium from 191 starts (a ratio of 52.3%) with a 2nd-place finish in the giant slalom in Adelboden.  On 29 January Hirscher won the GS in Garmisch, achieving his 20th GS and 43rd World Cup win, and with it attained Austria's 100th GS win for men.

At the FIS Alpine World Ski Championships 2017 in St. Moritz, Switzerland Hirscher won gold in the GS and slalom, and silver in the combined, missing the gold by just 0.01 seconds.  He was the most successful athlete at the championships.

On 4 March in Kranjska Gora, Slovenia, Hirscher won his third GS race of the season and with it secured his 4th GS World Cup title and his 6th overall World Cup title; the only male skier in history to do so. One day later Hirscher finished fourth in the slalom and with it secured his fourth World Cup slalom title.

The start of the 2018 season was expected to be more difficult as Hirscher suffered a fracture to his left ankle during the first day of snow training on 17 August. Fortunately the first race of the season in Sölden was cancelled due to high winds, giving Hirscher a few more weeks to recover. He made a last minute decision to race the slalom in Levi on 12 November and achieved a 17th-place finish. The next technical race was the GS in Val d'Isère on 9 December and Hirscher came 3rd. He won the slalom the next day.

On 17 December 2017, he won the giant slalom race in Alta Badia, which was his fifth consecutive victory in that location, surpassing Ivica Kostelić, who won the Kitzbühel combined 4 times in a row.

On 4 January 2018, Hirscher achieved his 5th win of the season in the slalom in Zagreb and with it his 50th World Cup win, matching the total of legendary technical racer Alberto Tomba. Two days later Hirscher achieved his sixth win of the season by winning the GS in Adelboden and moved to 3rd overall in the men's World Cup winners rankings. The next day he won the slalom in Adelboden. On 23 January, with his 9th win of the season in the Schladming night slalom, Hirscher equalled his compatriot Austrian ski legend Hermann Maier's 54 World Cup victories.  It was the 500th World Cup win for Austrian men.  On 28 January Hirscher moved to second overall in the men's World Cup winners rankings by winning the GS in Garmisch-Partenkirchen.

At the 2018 Pyeongchang Winter Olympics, Hirscher won gold in the men's combined event, his first competition of the games.
The win was not expected, as he had done little downhill training as a result of the pre season ankle injury.  5 days later he went on to win gold in the GS by 1.27 seconds, the biggest winning margin in Olympic GS since the 1968 Winter Olympics.

Following the Olympics, the World Cup technical races resumed in Kranjska Gora, Slovenia on 3 March with the GS.  Hirscher secured the GS crystal globe for the 5th time by winning the race with a winning margin of 1.66 seconds.  The following day, Hirscher also won the slalom with a winning margin of 1.22 seconds.  As a result, he also won the slalom crystal globe for the 5th time, and the overall crystal globe for the seventh time in succession with 2 technical races remaining.  His Olympic gold medals plus the additional crystal globes enabled him to reach the top of the standings in the greatest alpine skiers of all time men's super ranking. At the end of the slalom race, Hirscher said on Austrian television that he would go home "and consider where the journey will go. I don't know if I will be skiing World Cup next season".

At the World Cup finals in Åre, Hirscher won the GS race on 17 March and equaled the record of most wins in a single season: he shares the record of 13 wins with alpine skiing legends Ingemar Stenmark and Hermann Maier.  Unfortunately, the following day the slalom race was cancelled due to high winds, denying Hirscher the opportunity to obtain the record outright. Hirscher has started 245 World Cup races, has won 67 of them, (a ratio of 27%) has achieved 138 podiums (a ratio of 56%) and has finished 73% of his races in the Top 10.

In December 2018 Hirscher became Austria's most prolific World Cup race winner when he won a slalom in Saalbach-Hinterglemm in his native state of Salzburg, his 63rd World Cup victory, taking him past the previous record holder Annemarie Moser-Pröll. He took a total of 14 World Cup wins in 2018, breaking the previous record for most World Cup race wins in a single calendar year set by Ingemar Stenmark, but was eclipsed by Mikaela Shiffrin, who set a new record by winning 15 World Cup events during 2018. He was named as a L'Équipe Champion of Champions for 2018, as well as Eurosport's Sportsman of the Year.

On 13 January 2019 he won the slalom race in Adelboden and celebrated a 9th World Cup win and a 16th podium, a record among male athletes at a single resort. At the 2019 Alpine World Ski Championships in Åre in February, Hirscher took a silver in the giant slalom behind Henrik Kristoffersen, before winning the slalom by 0.65 seconds after holding a 0.56 second lead from the first run: Hirscher described his first run as one of the best performances of his career. He led teammates Michael Matt and Marco Schwarz in a clean sweep of the podium places, taking Austria's only gold of the championships, and preventing them from leaving a Worlds without a gold medal for the first time since 1987. It was Hirscher's seventh World Championship gold, tying him with compatriot Toni Sailer for the record number of Worlds golds won. Hirscher subsequently told the media that he would assess his future at the end of the season, but also stated that he thought that these were his last Worlds.

On 4 September 2019, Marcel Hirscher announced his retirement from alpine skiing. After his retirement, Hirscher was a presenter for an Austrian TV show. Despite videos of him training in a racing suit that circulated in December 2020, Hirscher insisted that he was not returning to competitive skiing.

In 2021 Hirscher developed and launched a brand of skis called Van Deer, that was later renamed to Van Deer-Red Bull in a partnership with Red Bull. The brand debuted competitively in the 2022–23 World Cup season, however due to the involvement of Red Bull in the new brand logo, there is currently an ongoing dispute between FIS and Van Deer-Red Bull about representing the brand in the official entries and results, and the brand logo is covered up by black tape during the events. Despite the disagreement, Hirscher's brand has quickly achieved success with former rival Henrik Kristoffersen, who scored a podium in the opening race at Sölden using the skis and earned Van Deer-Red Bull's first victory in Garmisch-Partenkirchen later in the season.

World Cup results

Season titles
 20 titles – (8 overall, 6 giant slalom, 6 slalom)

Season standings

Career statistics

Race victories

Podiums

Including both parallel slalom and parallel giant slalom.  Two parallel events have been classified in the sk-db.com results as classic events (the City Event slalom on 23/02/16 and the parallel GS on 18/12/17).  They are shown here as parallel events.

World Championships results

Olympic results

Personal life
In June 2018, Hirscher married Laura Moisl, his long-time girlfriend. On 7 October 2018, they celebrated the birth of their first child, a son. On 1 August 2021, the Austrian newspaper Kronen Zeitung reported that the couple, who have two children together, had separated after twelve years.

See also
Ski World Cup Most podiums & Top 10 results

References

External links
 
Marcel Hirscher World Cup standings at the International Ski Federation

Austrian Ski team (ÖSV) – official site – Marcel Hirscher – 
Atomic Skis – athletes – Marcel Hirscher

1989 births
Alpine skiers at the 2010 Winter Olympics
Alpine skiers at the 2014 Winter Olympics
Alpine skiers at the 2018 Winter Olympics
Austrian male alpine skiers
FIS Alpine Ski World Cup champions
Living people
Medalists at the 2014 Winter Olympics
Medalists at the 2018 Winter Olympics
Olympic alpine skiers of Austria
Olympic medalists in alpine skiing
Olympic gold medalists for Austria
Olympic silver medalists for Austria
People from Hallein
Audi Sport TT Cup drivers
Sportspeople from Salzburg (state)
21st-century Austrian people